A Streaker is a type of sailing dinghy designed in 1975 by Jack Holt. It is a light (minimum weight only 48 kg) one-person boat with a uni-rig stayed sail plan. It is sailed mainly in Britain and the Philippines, and over 1800 have been built. At first all boats were built of plywood, but since 1998 fibreglass, and fibreglass variants have been used, and now over half of new boats are of fibreglass or composite (fibreglass and wood) construction.

The hull design is a double chine hull, with little freeboard. The boat incorporates an unconventional raking daggerboard.  Recent developments have included a smaller sail, known as the 'Wave Sail' for use by lighter crews or in strong winds.

References

External links
 Streaker Class Owners Association

Dinghies
Boats designed by Jack Holt